Vya is a small ghost town located in Washoe County, in northwestern Nevada, United States. Not much remains of the small town, which essentially died in the 1920s. Just two wooden buildings can still be seen—the Vya Post Office and Library. The Vya Post Office was in operation from September 1910 until October 1941. The settlement was named for Vya Wimer, the first European heritage baby born in the valley.

The vicinity of Vya has since evolved into the Old Yella Dog Ranch, a working guest ranch, with facilities for RVs and camping.

In the winter of 1993, a young man named Jim Stolpa, his wife, and baby, became snowbound while driving through northern Nevada. After an almost 30-hour,  walk, Stolpa was found near Vya. The Stolpas' ordeal was made into a movie, Snowbound: The Jim and Jennifer Stolpa Story. Vya remains a ghost town to this day.

See also
List of ghost towns in Nevada

References

External links 

Ghost towns in Washoe County, Nevada